The Ropalomeridae are a family of acalyptrate flies.

Description
Ropalomeridae are robust flies of  body length, with a superficial resemblance to the Sarcophagidae in terms of body colour. The hind femora are conspicuously enlarged and the hind tibia is often laterally flattened and broadened and with broad, excavated vertex.

Biology
The biology of ropalomerid flies is little known, although they are thought to associated with rotting wood.

Classification
The Ropalomeridae currently comprise about 30 species distributed in 9 genera. Ropalomera is by far the largest genus of the family, with 15 known species.

These nine genera belong to the family Ropalomeridae:
 Acrocephalomyia Ibáñez-Bernal & Hernández-Ortiz, 2012 g
 Apophorhynchus Williston, 1895 c g
 Dactylissa Fischer, 1932 c g
 Kroeberia Linder, 1930 c g
 Lenkokroeberia Prado, 1966 c g
 Mexicoa Steyskal, 1947 i c g
 Rhytidops Lindner, 1930 i c g b
 Ropalomera Wiedemann, 1824 i c g
 Willistoniella Mik, 1895 i c g
Data sources: i = ITIS, c = Catalogue of Life, g = GBIF, b = Bugguide.net

Distribution
The Ropalomeridae are predominantly Neotropical, found from the southern United States to northern Argentina, with a single species (Rhytidops floridensis) known from the Nearctic realm. Most species occur in the central portion of South America.

References

External links
Family Ropalomeridae at EOL 
 bizarre sap flow fly - Rhytidops floridensis

Brachycera families
Sciomyzoidea
Taxa named by Erwin Lindner